Carlo Bossoli (6 December 1815, in Lugano – 1 August 1884, in Turin) was a Swiss-born Italian painter and lithographer, who spent his early career in Russia. He is best known for  historical scenes from the Risorgimento.

Biography 

His father was a stonemason of Italian origin, working in Switzerland. In 1820, his family moved to accept work in Odessa. Until 1826, he studied with the Capuchins. After graduating, he worked in a shop that sold antiquarian books and prints. It was there that he began to draw and sketch. In 1828, he was hired by the Odessa Opera to work as an assistant to Rinaldo Nannini, a stage designer who had studied at La Scala under Alessandro Sanquirico. He began to sell his paintings in 1833. His father died three years later and he found himself the sole support of his mother, his sister and her illegitimate son.

Luckily, his work drew the attention of Prince Mikhail Vorontsov, who commissioned him to paint several views of Odessa. Princess Elizabeta was impressed with his abilities and arranged for him to study in Italy from 1839 to 1840. He stayed mostly in Naples and Rome, giving special attention to tempera and gouache and associating with the many British artists who were living there. He returned in 1840 and settled in the coastal resort of Alupka, on the Vorontsov estate.

In 1844, at the request of his mother (who was ill), he moved to Milan and opened a studio there. In 1848, he produced popular scenes from "Five Days of Milan". His mother died the following year, but he remained there until 1853, when an unsuccessful uprising against the Austrians forced him to flee to Turin, which he used as his base of operations for travels to England, France, Spain, Morocco, Germany and Scandinavia.

During those years, he produced an album of paintings, showing views of Crimea, which was published in London by Vincent Brooks, Day & Son. It proved to be very popular due to public interest in the Crimean War. Later, in 1859, they commissioned him to produce a series of lithographs depicting the Second Italian War of Independence which were published as "The War in Italy".

After seeing them, young Prince Oddone, Duke of Montferrat gave him a commission to follow the Piedmontese Army and make a record of its campaigns. The result was an album of 150 tempera paintings and the Prince declared him to be "the painter of our history". He fell ill with a fever at this time and his productivity declined dramatically. He divided his time between decorating his home to resemble the Vorontsov Palace and doting on his nephew.

In 1883, at the age of sixty-eight, he married Adelaide De Carolis, who was only twenty-one. The marriage was generally believed to be a financial arrangement. The following year, he died of a heart attack. He was buried in Lugano and a street in Turin is named after him.

Selected paintings

See also
 List of Orientalist artists
 Orientalism

References

Further reading
 Ugo Donati; La guerra del Cinquantanove nei disegni di Carlo Bossoli, 1815 - 1884, pittore ticinese, Banco di Roma per la Svizzera, 1959
 Cinquant'anni di vita europea nei disegni e nei dipinti di Carlo Bossoli (exhibition catalog) Tipografia Torinese, 1974
 Rosanna Maggio Serra and Ada Peyrot; Carlo Bossoli: cronache pittoriche del Risorgimento (exhibition catalog)  Museo Nazionale del Risorgimento Italiano, 1985
 Cristina Vernizzi; Carlo Bossoli: cronache pittoriche del Risorgimento (1859-1861) nella Collezione di Eugenio di Savoia, Principe di Carignano, Artema, 1998

External links 

 The War in Italy, Day & Son (1859), full text @ Google Books
 Carlo Bossoli @ Artisti Ticinesi: Biography with more paintings.
 Brief biography and more paintings @ Libero

1815 births
1884 deaths
19th-century Italian painters
19th-century Swiss painters
19th-century Italian male artists
Swiss male painters
History painters
Landscape painters
Italian lithographers
Italian male painters
Italian unification
Orientalist painters
People from Lugano
Swiss-Italian people
Swiss emigrants to the Russian Empire
19th-century Swiss male artists